Giancarlo Brusati (6 March 1910 – 30 June 2001) was an Italian fencer. He won a gold medal in the team épée event at the 1936 Summer Olympics. He was the President of the Fédération Internationale d'Escrime from 1981 to 1984.

References

1910 births
2001 deaths
Italian male fencers
Olympic fencers of Italy
Fencers at the 1936 Summer Olympics
Olympic gold medalists for Italy
Olympic medalists in fencing
Fencers from Milan
Recipients of the Olympic Order
Medalists at the 1936 Summer Olympics
20th-century Italian people